The Dubai City of Gold is a Thoroughbred horse race run annually since 1998 at Nad Al Sheba Racecourse in Dubai, United Arab Emirates. Given the nickname for the city of Dubai, the Group 2 race is open to Northern and Southern Hemisphere bred horses age four years and up. It is raced on tuf at a distance of 2400 meters (app.  miles).

Initially a conditions race, it was upgraded to Group 3 status in 2001 and then to Group 2 status in 2009.

Records
Time record: 
 2:26.83 - Walton Street 2021

Most wins by an owner:
 13 - Godolphin 2001, 2002, 2003, 2010, 2011, 2014, 2015, 2017, 2018, 2019, 2020, 2021, 2023

Most wins by a jockey:
 6 - Frankie Dettori 1998, 1999, 2000, 2001, 2003, 2010

Most wins by a trainer:
 10 - Saeed bin Suroor 1998, 1999, 2000, 2001, 2002, 2003, 2010, 2014, 2015, 2017

Winners of the Dubai City of Gold

See also
 List of United Arab Emirates horse races

References
 Dubai City of Gold at the Emirates Racing Association
Racing Post:

Horse races in the United Arab Emirates
Sports competitions in Dubai